Norfolk Public Library may refer to:

 The Norfolk Library (Connecticut), a charitable organization open to the public
 Norfolk, Massachusetts Public Library
 Norfolk Public Library, operated by the City of Norfolk, Virginia